HMS Warmingham was one of 93 ships of the  of inshore minesweepers. All of the ships in this class had names that were chosen from villages ending in -ham. HMS Warmingham was named after Warmingham, in Cheshire, England.

References
Blackman, R.V.B. ed. Jane's Fighting Ships (1953)

 

Ham-class minesweepers
Royal Navy ship names
1954 ships
Ships built in England